Air-Van was an airline based in Armenia. It was forced to suspend operations after the Armenian civil aviation authority decided not  to extend its air operator certificate. It had operated two B747-200s and a DC-10 on charter services.

Air-Van was forbidden from landing in Switzerland and Belgium. These bans may have been the cause for Air Van to appear on a proposed Europe-wide blacklist of some airlines.

References

External links
Air-Van Airlines

Defunct airlines of Armenia
Airlines established in 2003
Airlines disestablished in 2005
Armenian companies established in 2003